The National Taiwan University of Sport (NTUS) is a public university specialized in sports in Taichung, Taiwan, and a member of the National University System of Taiwan.

NTUS once been merged with the National College of Physical Education and Sports, as a National Taiwan Sport University, but did not success eventually. This was the first case that Taiwan merged universities failed.

History

Founding 
National Taiwan University of Sport founded in June 1961 as the Taiwan Provincial Junior College of Physical Education, was Taiwan first three-year junior college that specialized in sport. In the beginning, only had a Department of Sport. In the next ten years, school added night school and Hsinchu campus (for five-year programs), but Hsinchu campus closed in 1980 and move back to Taichung.

In 1984, Taiwan Provincial College of Physical Education closed its night school. On 90s, school changes its affiliation from Taiwan Provincial Government to Ministry of Education and rename as the National Taiwan Junior College of Physical Education.

Merging failed 

In 1998, National Taiwan College of Physical Education is blazing a new campus in Puzi, Chiayi County, and place their library in Chiayi County Stadium before completion of their teaching complex building. Even though Chiayi campus had two departments and a graduate school, it's still been criticized cause its low usage. 

Taichung City Government entrusts Taichung Municipal Stadium to school in 2004.

School plans request change its name to National Taiwan Sports University, but the National College of Physical Education and Sports in Guishan, Taoyuan also wants the same name. Therefore, in 2008, the Ministry of Education pushes the merger of two schools, but main campus set in Taoyuan lead to teachers and students of the former National Taiwan College of Physical Education unpleased, eventually the merging case were failed in 2009.

Changed name 
After merging failed with the National College of Physical Education and Sports. In November 2011, MOE approved school change its name to National Taiwan University of Physical Education (NTUPE), and keep Chinese abbreviation of the National Taiwan Sports University.

School change its English name to National Taiwan University of Sport in August 2014, and closed Chiayi Campus after a year.

Academics 
NTUS has three colleges:

Campuses 

 Main Campus in North District, Taichung

Closed 
 Hsinchu Campus in Hsinchu County (1970~1980)
 Chiayi Campus in Puzi, Chiayi County (1998~2015)

Student life

Athletics 

The NTUS football club has participated in domestic football leagues since 1983. In recent years, they use different team names due to league regulations. 
 Enterprise Football League 2008: Molten Tso I (Molten佐儀)
 Intercity Football League 2008: Chia Cheng Hsin (家成興)
 Intercity Football League 2009: Kaohsiung Yoedy (高市耀迪)
2017 Taiwan Football Premier League: Hasus TSU F.C.(臺體光磊）
2018 Taiwan Football Premier League & 2019 Taiwan Football Premier League: NTUS（臺灣體大）
2020 Taiwan Football Premier League: Land Home NTUS （璉紅臺體）

The 500-capacity Taichung Taiyuan Football Pitch is used for home games.

Notable people

Alumni

Faculty

Transportation

Taichung City Bus

Relevant articles 
 National Taiwan Sport University
 University of Taipei (Tianmu Campus)
 List of universities in Taiwan

References

External links 
 NTUS website

1961 establishments in Taiwan
Educational institutions established in 1961
Sports universities and colleges
Sport in Taichung
Universities and colleges in Taichung
Universities and colleges in Taiwan